Kim Sik (born  in Jangheung-gun) is a South Korean bobsledder.

Kim competed at the 2014 Winter Olympics for South Korea. He teamed with driver Kim Dong-Hyun, Kim Kyung-Hyun and Oh Jea-Han as the South Korea-2 sled in the four-man event, finishing 28th.

As of April 2014, his best showing at the World Championships is 17th, in the four-man event in 2012.

Kim made his World Cup debut in February 2012. As of April 2014, his best World Cup finish is 13th, in 2011-12 at Whistler.

References

1985 births
Living people
Olympic bobsledders of South Korea
Sportspeople from South Jeolla Province
Bobsledders at the 2014 Winter Olympics
South Korean male bobsledders